Peter (Petrus) K. Masiza (c 1840 - 1907) was the first black Anglican priest ordained in South Africa.

Early life 

Masiza was born in Shiloh, near Whittlesea, Eastern Cape in about 1840.  He grew up in the Moravian Church.

In 1871 Peter's brother, Paul Masiza was ordained deacon in the Anglican Church of Southern Africa by the Henry Cotterill, bishop of Grahamstown. Paul died two years later; Peter Masiza followed in his brother's footsteps: he was ordained deacon in 1873 and later becoming the first black Anglican priest in South Africa, when on 24 June 1877 Henry Callaway, the first bishop of St John's ordained Masiza the first Xhosa priest in St John's Cathedral, Mthatha, and later the first black canon.

Commemoration 

The Anglican Church of Southern Africa commemorates Masiza in its Calendar of saints on the 5th day of December each year.  In addition the collect for this commemoration is as follows:

Notes and references

External links 
 Additional Collects for African Commemorations

19th-century South African Anglican priests
Year of birth uncertain
1907 deaths
1840s births